Francine McRae (born 27 April 1969, in Melbourne, Australia) is a softball player from Australia, who won a bronze medal at the 1996 Summer Olympics.

References

External links

1969 births
Living people
Australian people of Scottish descent
Australian softball players
Olympic softball players of Australia
Softball players at the 1996 Summer Olympics
Olympic bronze medalists for Australia
Sportswomen from Victoria (Australia)
Olympic medalists in softball
Sportspeople from Melbourne
Medalists at the 1996 Summer Olympics